Synkavichy is a village in Belarus. It is located in the Zelva District of Grodna Region.

The village is famous for its fortified church of Saint Michael.

Name 

Traditional name of the village is Synkóvichy, but it was changed in 1960s due to russification.

History 

The village is mentioned for the first time in connection with the church of St. Michael so it was founded roughly at the end of the 15th or at the beginning of the 16th century. Some scholars still think that the early 15th century is more probable. In that case the village was founded in the times of Vitaut.

Until the partitions of the Polish-Lithuanian Commonwealth Synkavichy was a part of the Grand Duchy of Lithuania. Then it became a part of the Russian Empire and stayed there until the World War I. Between wars it ended up in the Second Polish Republic and after the World War II was returned to Belarusian SSR and was included into Zielva District, now Belarus.

References

External links 
 

 Photos of Synkavichy at globus.tut.by
 Photos of Synkavichy at radzima.org

Villages in Belarus
Populated places in Grodno Region